Pittsburg is an unincorporated community in Van Buren County, Iowa, United States.  It is located at 40.75639ºN and 91.99167ºW.

History
 Pittsburg was laid out in 1839, and it was originally known as Rising Sun. It was named in honor of Pittsburgh, Pennsylvania.

Pittsburg's population was 80 in 1925.

Geography
Pittsburg is located at  (40.75639, -91.99167).

Notable person
Phil Stong was born in Pittsburg on January 27, 1899

References 

Unincorporated communities in Iowa
Unincorporated communities in Van Buren County, Iowa
1839 establishments in Iowa Territory
Populated places established in 1839